This is a list of unofficial international football games played by the Slovenia national football team.

Results
Key

Kingdom of Serbs, Croats and Slovenes

Yugoslavia (1945–1991)

Republic of Slovenia (1991–present)

References

Slovenia national football team results
Slovenia
National team results